Vicenzo Gotti (c. 1580 – 1636) was an Italian painter of the Baroque period.

He was born in Bologna, where he initially had been, alongside Guido Reni, a pupil of Dionysius Calvaert. At the age of 20 years, he moved to Rome with Reni. After some time, he moved to Naples, where he became a prolific painter. He died at Reggio Calabria.

References

1580s births
1636 deaths
16th-century Italian painters
Italian male painters
17th-century Italian painters
Painters from Bologna
Italian Baroque painters